Arthur Hamlin "A. H." Sholts (February 6, 1861 – September 2, 1934) was an American educator and politician.

Born in the town of Rutland, Dane County, Wisconsin, Sholts graduated from Oregon High School in Oregon, Wisconsin. He then graduated from the Whitewater State Teachers College. He was principal of the public schools in Evansville, Stoughton, and Oregon, Wisconsin. In 1907, he moved to his farm in the town of Oregon. Sholts served as chairman of the Oregon Town Board. In 1911, Sholts served in the Wisconsin State Assembly and was a Republican. In 1929, Wisconsin Governor Walter Kohler Sr. appointed Sholts to the Board of Regents of the University of Wisconsin. Sholts died at his home in Oregon, Wisconsin.

References

External links

1861 births
1934 deaths
University of Wisconsin–Whitewater alumni
Educators from Wisconsin
Farmers from Wisconsin
Mayors of places in Wisconsin
Republican Party members of the Wisconsin State Assembly
People from Oregon, Wisconsin
People from Stoughton, Wisconsin